Parliamentary elections were held in Bulgaria on 24 November 1913. The result was a victory for the Liberal Concentration, an alliance of the Liberal Party (Radoslavists), the People's Liberal Party and the Young Liberals Party, between them won 88 of the 204 seats. Voter turnout was 55%.

Results

References

Portugal
1913 in Bulgaria
Parliamentary elections in Bulgaria
November 1913 events
1913 elections in Bulgaria